Jakkur Aerodrome  is an airport located in Jakkur, a suburb of Bangalore, Karnataka, India. It is the only dedicated general aviation field in Bangalore. The airfield is the site of the Government Flying Training School (GFTS), the only flying school in the state.

The premises include facilities for flight training, area leased to private parties for hangars and maintenance activities and other common facilities (airstrip, fuel station etc.).

History
The airfield was then transferred to the Government of Karnataka on the condition that the latter would only build a flying school at Jakkur. The Government Flying Training School (GFTS) was established on 26 March 1949. It operated smoothly until 1997, when it faced a shortage of aircraft, fuel, maintenance engineers and flying instructors. The school has operated sporadically since then.

In January 2014, a flyover was completed over NH 44 to improve connectivity between the city centre and the far-away Kempegowda International Airport. Although the western half of the runway had already been closed off to accommodate, the government closed Jakkur Aerodrome on 8 June. The GFTS was forced to relocate, with 18 students still undergoing training. The school continued students' training at the airports in Hubli and Mysore. However, by October 2014 the school had resumed operations. The western portion of the runway remains closed, but a  extension is planned.

Runway 
Jakkur Aerodrome has a single runway, oriented 08/26 with dimensions . However, the runway threshold on the 08 side has been displaced to the east because of the obstructing flyover on the western side of the airfield. A taxiway runs parallel to the runway on its north side.

Government Flying Training School
The Government of Karnataka has been operating a flying school at Jakkur Aerodrome since 1949. The Government Flying Training School (GFTS) houses aircraft maintenance facilities, an aircraft and storage hangar, a library and other facilities. It has a fleet of two Cessna 152s and two Cessna 172s. The school also operates air traffic control at the airfield.

1 (Kar) Air Squadron NCC 
1 (Karnataka) Air Squadron NCC is a premier NCC Air Squadron of India and operates from Jakkur Aerodrome. The Unit was raised on 1 June 1954 as 1 (Mysore) Air Sqn NCC and in 1973 was designated 1 (Karnataka) Air Sqn NCC. This Unit imparts flying and institutional training to Air Wing Cadets of the NCC.

Other operators 
Jakkur serves as a base for several private aviation companies, including Confident Airlines, Jupiter Aviation Services, Agni Aviation and Bangalore Aerosports, which have popularised microlight flying from the airfield.

See also 

 List of airports in Karnataka

References

External links
 Government Flying Training School official website

Airports in Karnataka
Airports in Bangalore
1948 establishments in India
Airports established in 1948
20th-century architecture in India